Triplets on Board is a 1959 West German comedy film directed by Hans Müller and starring Heinz Erhardt, Ann Smyrner and Ingrid van Bergen. Three identical brothers all go on the same cruise using only one ticket.

The film's sets were designed by the art director Walter Haag.

Cast

References

Bibliography 
 Hake, Sabine. German National Cinema. Routledge, 2013.

External links 
 

1959 films
1959 comedy films
German comedy films
West German films
1950s German-language films
Films directed by Hans Müller
Seafaring films
Films about twin brothers
1950s German films